Terry Gill (25 October 1939 – 25 February 2015) was an English Australian actor, theatre owner, producer, director and writer. A character actor, he carved a niche in Australian television playing police officers. He appeared in over 26 Australian television productions either as a regular or in guest roles. He was often associated with Crawford Productions and Reg Grundy Organisation.

Early life

Born in England, Gill never knew his father. He immigrated to Australia with his actress wife Carole Ann Gill.

Career
Gill was a recurring cast member in the women's prison drama Prisoner as Det. Insp. Jack Grace, a regular cast member as Sgt. Jack Carruthers in The Flying Doctors and played another recurring role in Blue Heelers as Superintendent Clive Adamson. He appeared in a guest role on Neighbours.

Gill appeared in Crocodile Dundee as the leader of a group of kangaroo shooters whom Dundee (Paul Hogan) fights in the Walkabout Creek Hotel bar, and later uses a dead kangaroo as a cover to shoot at the shooters and scare them. He portrayed Santa Claus on Australian TV's annual Carols by Candlelight for 27 years (in later years alongside well-known children's entertainers Hi-5 and Australian TV icon Humphrey B. Bear).

For many years, Gill and his wife Carol Ann ran The Tivoli theatre restaurant in Melbourne, producing pantomimes and theatre shows featuring many well-known Australian performers.

Personal life
Gill was married to Carole Ann Gill (née Aylett) for 52 years (until his death). They had two children.

He suffered a mild stroke in late 2014. After suffering from lung cancer, he died in the inner Melbourne suburb of Richmond on 25 February 2015.

Filmography

References

External links
 

1939 births
2015 deaths
Australian male film actors
Australian male soap opera actors
Deaths from cancer in Victoria (Australia)
Deaths from lung cancer
English emigrants to Australia
Place of birth missing
20th-century Australian male actors
21st-century Australian male actors